Will Baillieu (born 15 August 1951) is an Australian rower. He competed in the men's coxed four event at the 1972 Summer Olympics. He is a brother of former Premier of Victoria, Ted Baillieu.

References

1951 births
Living people
Australian male rowers
Olympic rowers of Australia
Rowers at the 1972 Summer Olympics
Rowers from Melbourne